Acacia volubilis, also known as tangle wattle, is a shrub belonging to the genus Acacia. It is native to a small area in the Wheatbelt region of Western Australia. It has been declared endangered under the Commonwealth Environment Protection and Biodiversity Conservation Act 1999.

Description
The branchlets have a twisted appearance with parallel ridges running along their length. Each phyllode is widely separated from the next. It blooms in June and July and produces bright yellow inflorescences with a globular shape.

Taxonomy
The species was first formally described by the botanist Ferdinand von Mueller in 1877 in the work Fragmenta Phytographiae Australiae. It was reclassified as Racosperma volubile by Leslie Pedley in 2003 then back to the current name in 2006.<ref>{{cite web|url=https://bie.ala.org.au/species/http://id.biodiversity.org.au/node/apni/2905924#names|title=Acacia volubilis F.Muell.|accessdate=31 August 2018|work=Atlas of Living Australia|publisher=Global Biodiversity Information Facility}}</ref>

The species name is taken from the Latin word meaning twining referring to the twisted, tangled and twining habit of the plant.

Distribution
It is found in a small are between Cunderdin, Quairading and Tammin in gravelly sand or sandy clay soils. It is found along road verges and in shrubland communities over laterite or granite. Associated species include different species of Allocasuarina, Acacia, Grevillea, Actinostrobus and Hakea''. 

The species was thought to be extinct until botanist Brenden Lepschi found a small population near Cunderdin in 1996. Other populations were also found. Since each population was small and highly threatened, it was declared as Rare Flora in October 1996 and as Critically Endangered in December 1997. In 2003 only 88 plants were known spread over 12 populations.

See also
 List of Acacia species

References

volubilis
Acacias of Western Australia
Taxa named by Ferdinand von Mueller
Plants described in 1877